Jalan Transkrian, Federal Route 283, is a dual-carriageway federal road in Penang and Perak state, Malaysia, connecting Nibong Tebal in Penang to Parit Buntar in Perak. It is also a main route to Universiti Sains Malaysia (USM) Engineering Campus in Transkrian. The Kilometre Zero is located at Nibong Tebal, Penang.

At most sections, the Federal Route 283 was built under the JKR R5 road standard, allowing maximum speed limit of up to 90 km/h.

List of junctions and town

References

Malaysian Federal Roads